Renaud of Briel, in older literature Renaud of Bruyères, was a French knight and the first lord of the Barony of Karytaina in the Principality of Achaea, in Frankish Greece.

Hailing from Briel-sur-Barse in the French province of Champagne, Renaud had accompanied Geoffrey of Villehardouin on the Fourth Crusade, traveling directly to Syria rather than to Constantinople with the main crusader expedition. Renaud then went to Greece, where after five years of service as a knight, he was appointed lord of Karytaina (1209-1222) by Geoffrey of Villehardouin. Renaud’s younger brother Hugh joined him in Greece in 1215, married Geoffrey of Villehardouin’s only daughter Alix, and later succeeded Renaud as baron of Karytaina (ca. 1222-38).

References

Sources 
 
 
 

1220s deaths
Barons of Karytaina
Christians of the Fourth Crusade
Medieval Arcadia
People from Aube